The Glenwood Springs station is a railway station in Glenwood Springs, Colorado. It is served by Amtrak's California Zephyr, which runs between Chicago and Emeryville, California in the San Francisco Bay Area and is an overnight stop on Rocky Mountaineer's Rockies To Red Rocks luxury train service between Denver Colorado and Moab Utah. 

The Glenwood Springs station was originally built by the Denver and Rio Grande Western Railroad (D&RGW) in 1904, and sits close to the southern bank of the Colorado River. The station is composed of brick and Frying Pan River red sandstone, while the roof line is done in a jerkinhead, or Half-hip roof style. The entrance is flanked by medieval-inspired brick towers with pyramidal roofs. The Glenwood Railroad Museum occupies the former Ladies' Waiting Room.

The station also serves as one of two Greyhound bus stops in Glenwood Springs. However, The Roaring Fork Transportation Authority city bus does not stop here.

On June 7, 1977 Amtrak introduced the Pioneer, with service between Chicago and Seattle. On October 28, 1979, Amtrak initiated the Desert Wind service between Chicago and Los Angeles.  Both trains serviced Glenwood Springs. In 1991, the Pioneer was rerouted through Wyoming, and no longer stopped in Glenwood Springs. Both the Desert Wind and the Pioneer were discontinued on May 10, 1997. The California Zephyr entered service on April 24, 1983, and services Glenwood Springs to this day.

According to the Amtrak Fact Sheet (Colorado), Fiscal Year 2019, Glenwood Springs was the second busiest of the nine Colorado stations served by Amtrak.

The station and the town feature in an episode of the BBC television series Around the World in 80 Days with Michael Palin.

On August 15, 2021 luxury tourist railroad Rocky Mountaineer began using the station as an overnight stop for its Rockies to Red Rocks service.

References

External links 

Glenwood Springs Amtrak Station (USA RailGuide -- TrainWeb)

Amtrak stations in Colorado
Bus stations in Colorado
Former Denver and Rio Grande Western Railroad stations
Glenwood Springs, Colorado
Transportation buildings and structures in Garfield County, Colorado
Railway stations in the United States opened in 1904
1904 establishments in Colorado